Events from the year 1437 in Ireland.

Incumbent
Lord: Henry VI

Events
Treatment of Foreign Merchants Act 1437
Last entry from Mac Carthaigh's Book

References